Torstein Flakne (born December 17, 1960 in Trondheim, Norway) is a Norwegian singer and guitarist, best known for being the founder of the Norwegian rock band Stage Dolls. He is from Melhus and played in the band The Kids before founding Stage Dolls in 1985.

Discography

Studio albums
Shoot the Moon (1995, Mercury)
 "All & Everything"
 "Walkaway"
 "Heart of a Woman"
 "The Only One"
 "Cryin' Over You"
 "Big Wheels"
 "It Won't Happen Here"
 "Divorcee"
 "Hallelujah Preachers"
 "The Waiting Kind"
 "Trouble"
 "Sweet Dreams"

References

1960 births
Living people
Norwegian pop musicians
Norwegian rock guitarists
Stage Dolls members
The Kids (Norwegian band) members
Musicians from Melhus